Lycée Montaigne de N'Djamena (LFM) is a French international school in N'Djamena, Chad. Opened in 1977, the school caters for children from maternelle (preschool) through lycée (senior high school) levels.

See also

 Chad–France relations
 Education in Chad
 List of international schools

References

External links
  Lycée Montaigne de N'Djamena

20th-century establishments in Chad
1977 establishments in Africa
Buildings and structures in N'Djamena
Educational institutions established in 1977
Elementary and primary schools in Chad
N'Djamena
International high schools
International schools in Chad
N'Djamena
High schools and secondary schools in Chad